No Security is a live album by the Rolling Stones released by Virgin Records in 1998. Recorded over the course of the band's 1997–1998 worldwide Bridges to Babylon Tour, it was the band's eighth official full-length live release.

Not wishing to repeat songs from previous live albums Still Life (1982), Flashpoint (1991) and Stripped (1995), the Rolling Stones for the most part chose songs that had never been on a live release, including four from the band's most-recent studio album Bridges to Babylon (1997).  Taj Mahal and Dave Matthews appeared as special guests. The tracks were taken from live performances at the Amsterdam Arena, Capitol Theatre (Port Chester, New York) (for
MTV's Live from the 10 Spot), TWA Dome (St. Louis), River Plate Stadium (Buenos Aires), and Zeppelinfeld (Nuremberg).

The album was released in November 1998, and the band thereafter embarked on another tour, the No Security Tour, crossing North America for 34 shows in hockey and basketball arenas.

No Security peaked at number 67 on the UK Albums Chart, and at number 34 on the US Billboard 200. It failed to achieve US gold record status, selling more than 300,000 copies. The album was not reissued by UMe when Universal reissued the 1971–2005 back catalog.

Track listing
All songs by Mick Jagger and Keith Richards, except where noted.

"Intro" – 0:50
"You Got Me Rocking" – 3:26 (Amsterdam Arena, 6 July 1998)
"Gimme Shelter" – 6:22 (MTV 10 Spot 25 October 1997)
"Flip the Switch" – 4:12 (Amsterdam Arena, 1 July 1998)
"Memory Motel" – 6:05 (Amsterdam Arena, 5 July 1998)
"Corrina" (Taj Mahal/Jesse Ed Davis) – 4:17 (TWA Dome, St-Louis, MO, 12 December 1997)
"Saint of Me" – 5:25 (River Plate Stadium Buenos Aires, 4 April 1998)
"Waiting on a Friend" – 5:02 (TWA Dome, St-Louis, MO, 12 December 1997)
"Sister Morphine" (Jagger/Richards/Marianne Faithfull) – 6:16 (Amsterdam Arena, 6 July 1998)
"Live with Me" – 3:54 (Amsterdam Arena, 1 July 1998)
"Respectable" – 3:35 (Amsterdam Arena, 5 July 1998)
"I Just Want to Make Love to You" (Willie Dixon) – 5:19 (Amsterdam Arena 1 July 1998)
"Thief in the Night" (Jagger/Richards/Pierre de Beauport) – 5:37 (Zeppelinfeld Nuremberg 13 June 1998)
"The Last Time" – 4:47 (TWA Dome, St-Louis, MO, 12 December 1997)
"Out of Control" – 7:59 (River Plate Stadium Buenos Aires, 4 April 1998)
"I Just Want to Make Love to You" is a bonus track available only on the Japanese edition.

Personnel
The Rolling Stones
Mick Jagger – lead vocals, harmonica, and guitar
Keith Richards – guitar and vocals
Ronnie Wood – electric and lap slide guitar
Charlie Watts – drums

Additional musicians
Darryl Jones – bass guitar, backing vocals
Chuck Leavell – keyboards, backing vocals
Pierre de Beauport – Wurlitzer electric piano on "Thief in the Night"
Bobby Keys – saxophone
Andy Snitzer – saxophone, keyboards
Kent Smith – trumpet
Michael Davis – trombone
Bernard Fowler – backing vocals, percussion
Lisa Fischer – backing vocals
Blondie Chaplin – backing vocals, percussion
Leah Wood – backing vocals on "Thief in the Night"
Johnny Starbuck – shaker on "Out of Control"

Special guests
Dave Matthews – vocals on "Memory Motel"
Taj Mahal – vocals on "Corinna"
Joshua Redman – saxophone on "Waiting on a Friend"

Recording credits
River Plate Stadium Buenos Aires, 4 April 1998
 Engineering – Ed Cherney and David Hewitt at Remote Recording Services

Chart positions
Album

Singles

References

Albums produced by the Glimmer Twins
The Rolling Stones live albums
1998 live albums
Virgin Records live albums